Rodrigo González Sesma (born March 13, 1968 in Torreón, Coahuila, Mexico) is a retired Olympic freestyle swimmer. He competed at two consecutive Summer Olympics.

International competitions

Summer Olympics 
The first was the 1988 Summer Olympics in Seoul, South Korea, as part of the Mexico swimming team of seven men and three women that competed in 21 sporting events. The second was the 1992 Summer Olympics in Barcelona, Spain, as part of the Mexico swimming team of four men and five women that competed in 8 sporting events.

Pan American Games 
He won the bronze medal in the Men's 100m Freestyle at the 1991 Pan American Games.

References

External links

1968 births
Living people
Mexican male swimmers
Mexican male freestyle swimmers
Swimmers at the 1987 Pan American Games
Swimmers at the 1988 Summer Olympics
Swimmers at the 1991 Pan American Games
Swimmers at the 1992 Summer Olympics
Olympic swimmers of Mexico
Sportspeople from Torreón
Pan American Games bronze medalists for Mexico
Pan American Games medalists in swimming
Competitors at the 1986 Central American and Caribbean Games
Competitors at the 1990 Central American and Caribbean Games
Central American and Caribbean Games gold medalists for Mexico
Central American and Caribbean Games medalists in swimming
Medalists at the 1991 Pan American Games
20th-century Mexican people